Princess Jones is a 1921 American silent comedy film directed by Gustav von Seyffertitz and starring Alice Calhoun, Vincent Coleman and Helen Dubois.

Synopsis
Princess Jones, the niece of a country store keeper, dreams of being a wealthy, glamorous lady. While at an luxurious nearby resort she meets the wealthy Arthur Forbes, who falls in love with her and buys her an expensive coat. This leads her to be mistaken by the other guests as a Balkan princess and attracts the eye of a gang of kidnappers.

Cast
 Alice Calhoun as Princess Jones
 Vincent Coleman as Arthur Forbes
 Helen Dubois as Matilda Cotton
 Robert Lee Keeling as Roger Arlington
 Robert Gaillard as Detective Carey
 Joseph Burke as Jed Bramson
 Sadie Mullen as Tessa

References

Bibliography
 Connelly, Robert B. The Silents: Silent Feature Films, 1910-36, Volume 40, Issue 2. December Press, 1998.
 Munden, Kenneth White. The American Film Institute Catalog of Motion Pictures Produced in the United States, Part 1. University of California Press, 1997.

External links
 

1921 films
1921 comedy films
1920s English-language films
American silent feature films
Silent American comedy films
American black-and-white films
Films directed by Gustav von Seyffertitz
Vitagraph Studios films
Films with screenplays by Joseph F. Poland
1920s American films